Shulgino is a rural locality (a village) in Novlyanskoye Rural Settlement, Selivanovsky District, Vladimir Oblast, Russia. The population was 92 as of 2010. There are 5 streets.

Geography 
Shulgino is located 12 km south of Krasnaya Gorbatka (the district's administrative centre) by road. Selishche is the nearest rural locality.

References 

Rural localities in Selivanovsky District